Fletcher Allison Louallen (born September 12, 1962) is a former American football free safety who played one season in the National Football League (NFL) for the Minnesota Vikings and one season in the United States Football League (USFL) for the Birmingham Stallions. He played college football at West Alabama.

Early life and education
Louallen was born on September 12, 1962, in Jefferson, South Carolina. He attended Central High School in Pageland, South Carolina, graduating in c. 1980. He committed to the University of West Alabama, where he spent all four seasons on their football roster. When he was a senior in 1983, the West Alabama defense was nicknamed the "Legion of Doom" and Louallen was called the "head Legionnaire." That year he made 43 tackles, three-for-loss, two interceptions and recovered a fumble.

Professional career
Louallen was selected in the 14th round (282nd overall) of the 1984 USFL Draft by the Birmingham Stallions, but instead chose to sign with the Winnipeg Blue Bombers of the Canadian Football League (CFL), saying, "Winnipeg's offer was a lot better than Birmingham's." He was released before the season started. In 1985, Louallen signed with the Birmingham Stallions. He appeared in eight total games with the team.

After sitting out the 1986 season, Louallen was signed by the St. Louis Cardinals of the National Football League (NFL). He was released in August. When the Players Association went on strike early in the season, he was signed by the Minnesota Vikings as a replacement player. Louallen started three games, making one interception return of 16 yards before being released when the strike ended. Louallen was re-signed by Minnesota for the  season, but was placed on injured reserve in August and released on September 1.

References

1962 births
Living people
American football safeties
West Alabama Tigers football players
Winnipeg Blue Bombers players
Birmingham Stallions players
St. Louis Cardinals (football) players
Minnesota Vikings players
National Football League replacement players
Players of American football from South Carolina
People from Chesterfield County, South Carolina